Noémie Nadaud (born 18 April 1995) is a French female acrobatic gymnast. With partners Alizée Costes and Madeleine Bayon, Nadaud achieved 7th in the 2014 Acrobatic Gymnastics World Championships.

References

1995 births
Living people
French acrobatic gymnasts
Female acrobatic gymnasts